Mahipal railway station is a halt railway station on the Barharwa–Azimganj–Katwa loop of Malda railway division of Eastern Railway zone. It is located at Kanchia Bishnudanga, Patkeldanga village, Mahipal of Murshidabad district in the Indian state of West Bengal.

History
In 1913, the Hooghly–Katwa Railway constructed a  broad gauge line from Bandel to Katwa, and the Barharwa–Azimganj–Katwa Railway constructed the -wide  broad gauge Barharwa–Azimganj–Katwa loop. With the construction of the Farakka Barrage and opening of the railway bridge in 1971, the timetable of this line completely changed. Total 9 passenger trains stop at Mahipal railway station.

References

Railway stations in Murshidabad district
Malda railway division